Comocritis is a genus of moths of the family Xyloryctidae.

Species
Comocritis albicapilla Moriuti, 1974
Comocritis circulata Meyrick, 1918
Comocritis constellata Meyrick, 1909
Comocritis cyanobactra Meyrick, 1922
Comocritis enneora Meyrick, 1914
Comocritis heliconia Meyrick, 1933
Comocritis nephelista Meyrick, 1914
Comocritis olympia Meyrick, 1894
Comocritis pieria Meyrick, 1906
Comocritis pindarica Meyrick, 1924
Comocritis praecolor Meyrick, 1914
Comocritis thespias Meyrick, 1909
Comocritis uranias Meyrick, 1909

References

Markku Savela's ftp.funet.fi

 
Xyloryctidae
Taxa named by Edward Meyrick
Xyloryctidae genera